Black Box Affair is a 1966 Italian-Spanish Eurospy film written and directed by Marcello Ciorciolini and starring Craig Hill (at his only spy film) and  Teresa Gimpera.  Hill first met Gimpera in this film, and the couple got married shortly later. It is one of the rare films of the time depicting an alliance between Soviets and Americans to face a higher menace.

Plot

Cast 

 Craig Hill as Johnny Grant 
  Teresa Gimpera 	 as Floriane 
 Luis Marín  as Pablo 
 George Rigaud 	 as General MacGregor 
 Rolf Tasna 	 as Fabian 
 Rossella Bergamonti as Myriam (credited as Patricia Carr) 
 George Wang  as a Chinese agent  
 Moa Tahi as Ambra

References

External links

1966 films
1960s spy thriller films
1960s Italian-language films
Italian spy thriller films
Spanish spy thriller films
Films directed by Marcello Ciorciolini
Films scored by Riz Ortolani
1960s Italian films
1960s Spanish films